Dactylogyridea is an order of parasitic flatworms in the class Monogenea.

Families

Amphibdellatidae Carus, 1885
Ancylodiscoididae Gusev, 1961

Ancyrocephalidae Bychowsky & Nagibina, 1968 ("temporary name")

Calceostomatidae Parona & Perugia, 1890
Dactylogyridae Bychowsky, 1933
Diplectanidae Monticelli, 1903
Fridericianellidae Gupta & Sachdeva, 1990
Neocalceostomatidae Lim, 1995
Neotetraonchidae Bravo-Hollis, 1968
Protogyrodactylidae Johnston & Tiegs, 1922
Pseudodactylogyridae
Tetraonchidae Bychowsky, 1937
Urogyridae Bilong Bilong, Birgi & Euzet, 1994

References

Monopisthocotylea
Platyhelminthes orders